Squawkers McCaw is a animatronic children's toy bird from Fur Real that acts like a real parrot.

Summary
It was introduced in 2006 by Hasbro in the United States. The technology behind the bird allows the young child to enjoy a simulation of having a pet bird. The squawking sounds the toy produces are recordings of a parrot. Feeding the Squawkers McCaw toy with a pretend cracker brings positive reinforcement for the child with some English phrases. While the "toy cracker" is not consumed by the toy, Squawkers McCaw enjoys the "cracker" as if were real food.

The voice behind the popular toy was done by 23-year-old E. Shapiro. The phrases the toy speaks consist of basic American English words that are repeated from the child and a pre-set vocabulary of words. Vocabulary is limited on Squawkers McCaw toy birds because the toy is intended for a juvenile audience. As of 2008, all television advertising was pulled from the Squawkers McCaw toy. The toy line was disestablished in 2008.

The official music of Squawkers McCaw is mid-80s through early 90s slow jams with the House Tom sound effect. The official song of Squawkers McCaw is "I Start You Up, You Turn Me On" by Levert. The House Tom sound effect says "CahCahCahCah". An example of a song with this sound effect is "You Got Me Hanging On Seat Belts" by Loose Ends.

The Official Squawkers Macaw Song Lyrics
Let's Rock To The Squawk Walk!

Let's move our feet, sway to the beat Singing squawk, squawk, squawk!

Lean to the left, sway to the right, singing squawk, squawk, squawk!

Turn your head, look all around, Flap your wings to the funky sound!

If you want to dance and rock, raise your beak and give a squawk! *bird squawk*

So we can rock, rock, rock, rock, yeah!

So rock that squawk walk, yeah!

Sing squawk, squawk, squawk!

Sing squawk, squawk, squawk!

All right, rock that squawk walk. *bird squawk*

2000s toys
Products introduced in 2007
Hasbro products
Toy animals